"Horny" is the fourth single released by OPM, taken from the album ForThemAsses. It was released on Suburban Noize Records in 2005.

Track listings
CD 1
"Horny" (clean edit) – 3:34
"Horny" (uncensored edit) – 3:34
"Conflict" – 4:09
"Horny" (video)

CD 2
"Horny" (clean edit) – 3:34
"Horny" (uncensored edit) – 3:34
"Rollin" – 3:49
"Horny" (video)

Charts

References

2005 singles
2004 songs
OPM (band) songs
Songs written by Nikki Sixx